The Home Improvement Programme (HIP) is a programme announced by HDB, during the National Day Rally in August 2007 that replaced the Main Upgrading Programme (MUP). The HIP offers lessees a choice on the works they want to be included in the upgrading of their flats. It also helps lessees deal with common maintenance problems in ageing flats, such as spalling concrete and ceiling leaks, in a systematic and comprehensive manner. Flats are eligible for HIP twice, one at 30 years old and one at 60-70 years old. The HIP is targeted at flats built til 1997. Priority of upgrading programmes is traditionally given to wards held by the ruling People's Action Party, which appoints the Minister for National Development who oversees the Housing Development Board. When asked why opposition wards are penalised by the statutory board at a NUS student forum in 2011, Prime Minister Lee Hsien Loong responded, "The answer is that there has to be a distinction. Because the PAP wards supported the Government and the policies which delivered these good things.”

Scope of Works

Essential Improvements
These are improvements deemed necessary for public health, safety or technical reasons. They are compulsory if HIP is polled successfully.
 Replacement of waste pipes
 Repair of spalling concrete
 Repair of structural cracks
 Replacement of pipe sockets
 Upgrading of electrical supply

Optional Improvements
Owners may opt out of any or all of these improvements, with a corresponding reduction in co-payment. However, to opt out of toilet upgrading, the toilets will have to pass a water test for leaks. This is to prevent ceiling leaks at the flat below.
 Upgrading of toilets
 Replacement of entrance door
 Replacement of entrance grille gate
 Replacement of refuse hopper 

It was also announced in Parliament on 5 March 2012, that HDB will introduce more elderly friendly options under the HIP. These improvements come under the Enhancement for Active Seniors (EASE) and aims to create a safer and more comfortable living environment for them. 

 Slip resistant treatment for bathroom floors
 Grab bars
 Ramps at the main entrance of flats and in the flats

HIP Ramp Up
With the ramp up in HIP, Enhancement for Active Seniors (EASE), which is implemented with HIP, will also be stepped up. Elderly residents will benefit from EASE earlier, and enjoy grab-bars, ramps and slip-resistant treatment to floor tiles to help make their homes elderly-friendly.

Construction
The construction period for a typical precinct comprising eight to ten blocks will take about one and a half to two years. Works in each flat will take 10 days or less, depending on the improvements chosen.

References

Public housing in Singapore
Real estate in Singapore
Singapore government policies